The Gulf Coast toad (Incilius valliceps) is a species of toad native to eastern and southeastern Mexico and Central America as far south as Costa Rica.

Description 

Their back varies in color from nearly black, to shades of brown and grey with a distinctive white or yellowish colored stripe down the center, and sometimes lighter colored patches on the sides. Their underside is yellow or cream colored. Their back is covered in small tubercles, while their underside is normally devoid of them.

I. valliceps has the most extensive ridging of any toad in its geographic range. The ridges extend from the nose, to the back of the head, and with a branch that wraps around the back side of the eye.

Habitat 
The Gulf Coast toad is found in a wide range of habitats, including open grassland, semi-arid regions, light forest, and even suburban backyards. They are typically found not far from a permanent water source, which they use for breeding in the spring, but they are capable of travelling long distances while foraging for food.

Diet 
Like most toads, the Gulf Coast toad is an opportunistic carnivore. It will eat almost any small arthropod it is able to overpower and swallow.

References 

valliceps
Amphibians of Belize
Amphibians of Costa Rica
Amphibians of El Salvador
Amphibians of Guatemala
Amphibians of Honduras
Amphibians of Mexico
Amphibians of Nicaragua
Amphibians described in 1833
Taxa named by Arend Friedrich August Wiegmann